Karl-Ludwig Kratz (born April 23, 1941, in Jena, Thuringia) is a German nuclear chemist and astrophysicist. He is professor for nuclear chemistry at the Johannes Gutenberg University of Mainz and adjunct professor of physics at the University of Notre Dame in South Bend, Indiana.

One of the main interests of Kratz is the study of nuclear structure of very neutron-rich isotopes. He concentrated on the beta-delayed neutron decay mode, especially the spectroscopy of the emitted neutrons. These isotopes are obtained by nuclear fission or proton induced spallation of heavy elements as uranium. In general, the extremely neutron-rich species of interest are produced together with an overwhelming amount of shorter-lived ones. Therefore, he is developing chemical and physical separation techniques with very high chemical selectivity. These studies are performed in international collaborations at high-flux reactors (Institut Laue-Langevin, France) or accelerator facilities as the CERN in Switzerland or the National Superconducting Cyclotron Laboratory at Michigan State University.

The nuclear structure data are also applied by Kratz to nucleosynthesis, especially the astrophysical r-process. Elemental abundances from Supernova explosions are calculated in close collaboration with Friedrich-Karl Thielemann of the University of Basel. The calculated abundances are then compared to observed stellar abundances. Ultra-metal-poor Population II stars in the Galactic Halo exhibit a scaled-down Solar System r-process abundance pattern. Comparing calculated and observed abundances for elements as the stable europium with 
radioactive ones (thorium and uranium) the age of these stars can be determined to about 13 billion years (see Sneden's Star, Cayrel's Star, BD +17° 3248, HE 1523-0901).

In 1999 he received the Nuclear Chemistry Award (now Glenn T. Seaborg Award) of the American Chemical Society. In 2014, the American Physical Society rewarded him the Hans A. Bethe Prize.

References

1941 births
Living people
20th-century German chemists
Academic staff of Johannes Gutenberg University Mainz
University of Notre Dame faculty
21st-century German chemists
Scientists from Jena